Spinner is the generic term for the fictional flying cars used in the film Blade Runner. A Spinner can be driven as a ground-based vehicle, take off vertically, hover, and cruise using jet propulsion much like the Vertical Take-Off and Landing (VTOL) aircraft currently in use today. They are used extensively by the police to patrol and survey the population, and it is clear that despite restrictions wealthy people can acquire spinner licenses. The vehicle was conceived and designed by Syd Mead and has been "replicated" in subsequent films such as The Fifth Element and the Star Wars prequel trilogy. These films have the popular vision of flying cars, and people use spinners like traditional cars; in Blade Runner, the flying cars substitute for helicopters and very light jets.
 	
Designer Mead has described the spinner as an aerodyne – a vehicle which directs air downward to create lift, though press kits for the film stated that the spinner was propelled by three engines: "conventional internal combustion, jet and anti-gravity".
	 
A Spinner is currently on permanent exhibit at the Science Fiction Museum and Hall of Fame in Seattle, WA.

List of appearances

In-universe
 Blade Runner (1982) - Spinners are seen prominently in Blade Runner. Deckard and Gaff are seen riding in police spinners, and other various spinners driven by the "general" public, Very Important Person public are seen flying through the city.	 	
 Trancers (1985) - The sedan used by Deckard can be seen in a repair shop.	
 Solar Crisis (1990) - A repainted police spinner is used.	
 Soldier (1998) - A spinner can be seen in a pile of wrecked vehicles in one scene.
 Blade Runner 2049 (2017) - Officer K and other members of the LAPD are seen riding in police spinners, and other various spinners driven by the "general" public, VIP public are seen flying through the city. Certain spinners are also being used by the members of the Wallace Corporation. The spinner flown by Officer K was branded as a Peugeot as a part of a marketing deal that later resulted in a lawsuit between Peugeot and Alcon Entertainment.

Cameos and out-of-universe appearances 

	
 The film Back to the Future Part II paid homage to the Spinner from Blade Runner in that a garishly repainted spinner can be seen parked on a street. 
 Another tribute to the Blade Runner spinner can be seen at various points in the Star Wars films: they are seen in The Phantom Menace and Attack of the Clones. The homage was made in part because of the similarities between 2019 Los Angeles, as seen in Blade Runner, and the landscape of the planet Coruscant, as seen in the Star Wars films.
 The video game Snatcher (itself influenced by Blade Runner) has "turbocycles" that are extremely similar to Spinners.
 The THQ published video game Stuntman: Ignition developed by Paradigm Entertainment has an unlockable vehicle heavily influenced by the Spinner's design.
 The 2002 videogame TimeSplitters 2 by Free Radical Design includes a level set in 2019 that pays homage to Blade Runner and features a flying patrol car that resembles a Spinner.
 A spinner and the sedan used by Deckard appear in the videoclip made for the Earth, Wind & Fire song Magnetic (1983).
 The manga and anime series Silent Mobius features aerial vehicles clearly based on the spinner.
The music video for the Run The Jewels song yankee and the brave (ep. 4) features police cars modeled after the Spinner.

References

External links 
 Science Fiction Museum and Hall of Fame Blade Runner Flying Spinner Car on permanent exhibit.
 BladeZone interview with Gene Winfield, builder of the full-sized spinners
 BRmovie.com – Spinner collectibles
 TheForce.net – 3D Spinner model
 MattWalsh.com – Spinner blueprint
 RoadableTimes.com – History of flying cars	 
 PropSummit — An online community featuring discussion of the props from Blade Runner
 skychaser.se - A real Blade Runner Style roadable flying car being developed in Sweden

Spinner
Blade Runner (franchise)
Fictional cars
Fictional elements introduced in 1982
Flying cars in fiction
Art vehicles
Drones in fiction
One-off cars